Kanombe may refer to:

Kanombe Airport
Kicukiro District#Sectors